A goddess is a female deity.

Goddess may also refer to:

Film
 Goddess: How I fell in Love, a 2004 Russian drama film
 Goddess (2013 film), an Australian romantic comedy film
 The Goddess (1915 film), an American silent film, with a screenplay by Charles Goddard
 The Goddess (1934 film), a Chinese silent film
 The Goddess (1958 film), an American drama film
 Devi (1960 film) (The Goddess), a Bengali drama film
 The Goddess of 1967, a 2000 Australian film featuring the purchase of a Citroën DS

Music
 Goddess (band), a Dutch Eurodance group
 Goddess (Banks album), 2014
 Goddess (Emm Gryner album), 2009
 Goddess, a 1990 album by Soho
 Goddess, a 2008 album by Shawna Russell
 "Goddess", song by Banks from the album Goddess
 "Goddess", song by Miroslav Vitous and Jan Garbarek from the album Atmos
 "Goddess", song by Jefferson Starship from the album Windows of Heaven
 "Goddess", song by Pentagram from the album Show 'Em How
 "Goddess", song by Avril Lavigne from the album Head Above Water
 "Goddess", song by Crime & the City Solution from the album American Twilight
 "Goddess", song by Iggy Azalea from the album The New Classic
 "Goddess", song by Jaira Burns

Other uses
 Goddess (comics), an aspect of the Marvel Comics character Adam Warlock
 Goddess movement, a group of people interested in the social and religious aspects of the Goddess since the 1970s
 Triple Goddess (Neopaganism)
 Goddess, anglicized form of Déesse, nickname of the Citroën DS
 God (MUD), in its feminine form, referring to an administrator of a MUD
 Column of the Goddess, or the Goddess, nickname for the Memorial of the Siege of 1792, in Lille, France

See also
 :Category:Goddesses
 Oh My Goddess (disambiguation)
 Goddess of victory (disambiguation)
 Goddess worship (disambiguation)
 Gods (disambiguation)
 Gender of God
 God (disambiguation)